The Embassy of the Republic of Mali in Moscow is the diplomatic mission of Mali in the Russian Federation and accredited to several countries of the former CIS. It is located at 11 Novokuznetskaya Street in the Zamoskvorechye District of Moscow.

See also 
 Mali–Russia relations
 Diplomatic missions in Russia

References 

Mali–Russia relations
Mali
Moscow
Buildings and structures completed in 1900
Zamoskvorechye District
Cultural heritage monuments of regional significance in Moscow